The Tinau is a Class- II category River originating from the Mahabharat Mountains and flowing through the Siwalik Hills and Terai Plain at Butwal, Nepal before joining the Ganges.

River morphology
The length of the Tinau is 95 km starting from Palpa to Indo-Nepal Border at Marchawar. The catchment area of the river is about 1081 sq. km up to the border.

River flow
The minimum flow of the river is about 2.2 m3/s in April while the calculated 100 years return period flow in 2500m3/s.

The maximum recorded flow at DHM station no 390 is as follows:

Floods
1981

In 1981, there was a huge flood that destroyed two suspension bridges and the powerhouse shaft of Himal Hydro.

2007

In the flood of 2007 at least 500 households of Butwal municipality were displaced.

2008

In 2008, due to outburst of embankment, about 250 households were displace in Butwal municipality due to the flood.

Water Use

Hydropower
Tinau Hydropower Plant

References

Rivers of Lumbini Province